The Rameswaram–Kanniyakumari Express is a Superfast train belonging to Southern Railway zone that runs between  and  in India. It is currently being operated with 22621/22622 train numbers on tri-weekly basis. It is the only superfast express train service that originates and terminates within south Tamil Nadu region itself. This train service is mainly introduced to connect two important world famous Tourist Spots of Tamil Nadu and India so that tourist who can able to visit to these places easily.

Service

The 22621/Rameswaram–Kanniyakumari Superfast Express has an average speed of 56 km/hr and covers 407 km in 7h 20m. The 22622/Kanniyakumari–Rameswaram Superfast Express has an average speed of 56 km/hr and covers 407 km in 7h 20m.

This train has a single rake reversal at Madurai Junction. At present from Rameswaram to Madurai this train is powered by Diesel Traction and from Madurai to Kanyakumari this train is powered by electric traction and vice versa. This train's rakes are being Shared with Rameswaram–Tirupathi Meenakshi Express.

Coach composition

 3 AC III Tier
 12 Sleeper coaches
 6 General
 2 Second-class Luggage/parcel van

See also 

 Rameswaram railway station
 Kanniyakumari railway station
 Rameswaram–Tirupathi Meenakshi Express

Notes

References

External links 

 22621/Rameswaram–Kanniyakumari SF Express India Rail Info
 22622/Kanniyakumari–Rameswaram SF Express India Rail Info

Transport in Rameswaram
Transport in Kanyakumari
Express trains in India
Rail transport in Tamil Nadu
Railway services introduced in 2009